Sultan Mahmud Badaruddin II International Airport Station or SMB II International Airport Station is a station of the Palembang LRT Line 1 in Indonesia. It is located within the airport complex.

The station is one of six that opened at the Palembang LRT launch on 1 August 2018.

Station layout

References

Palembang
Railway stations in South Sumatra
Railway stations opened in 2018
Airport railway stations in Indonesia